A number of Catholic priests have served in civil office. The Catholic Church discourages this practice.

In canon law
Canon 285 of the 1983 Code of Canon Law, which governs the Latin Church, is a provision of Roman Catholic canon law that prohibits members of the Catholic clergy from doing things that are "unbecoming" or "foreign to the clerical state".  In addition, it prohibits diocesan priests and bishops from serving in "public offices which entail a participation in the exercise of civil power".

Law in particular countries

Bolivia 
The Constitution of Bolivia prohibits clergy from serving as president.

Costa Rica 
The Constitution of Costa Rica prohibits clergy from serving as president.

El Salvador 
The Constitution of El Salvador prohibits clergy from serving as president.

Honduras 
The Constitution of Honduras prohibits clergy from serving as president.

Mexico 
The Constitution of Mexico prohibits clergy from serving as president.

Myanmar 
Article 121, section i of the Constitution of Myanmar prohibits a member of a religious order from serving as president.

Nicaragua 
The Constitution of Nicaragua prohibits clergy from serving as president.

Paraguay
Article 235 of the Constitution of Paraguay prohibits any minister of any religion from serving as the president.

Venezuela 
The Constitution of Venezuela prohibits clergy from serving as president.

Examples by country

Austria 
Ignaz Seipel, a priest, theologian and academic, served as the Foreign Minister of Austria from 1926 to 1929 and in 1930, and served as Chancellor of Austria from 1922 to 1924 and 1926 to 1929.

Theodor Innitzer, who would become a cardinal and Archbishop of Vienna, served as the Austrian Minister of Social Affairs from 1929 to 1930.

Canada 
Three Catholic priests have been elected to the House of Commons of Canada.

Andrew Hogan was the first Catholic priest to serve as a Canadian Member of Parliament. First elected to represent the electoral district of Cape Breton—East Richmond, Nova Scotia, in the 1974 federal election, he was re-elected in 1979 but defeated in 1980. Hogan was a member of the New Democratic Party.

Robert Ogle was elected to the House of Commons in 1979 in the electoral district of Saskatoon East, Saskatchewan. Ogle was re-elected in 1980. He chose not to seek re-election in 1984 as a result of the new ban by the Holy See on clergy in public office. Like Hogan, Ogle was a member of the New Democratic Party.

Raymond Gravel was elected in a 2006 by-election in the electoral district of Repentigny, Quebec. He had received a dispensation from his diocesan bishop to enter politics. Gravel did not seek re-election in the 2008 federal election after Holy See authorities ordered him to choose between politics and the priesthood following controversy over his opposition to anti-abortion Bill C-484 and his support for the Order of Canada nomination of abortion rights activist Henry Morgentaler. Although he chose to leave politics, Gravel maintained that he remained, in accordance with Catholic doctrine, opposed to abortion. Gravel was a member of the nationalist Bloc Québécois.

Czech Republic 
Daniel Herman is a laicized Roman Catholic priest who was Minister of Culture, representing the Christian Democratic Union – Czechoslovak People's Party (KDU-ČSL).

Dominican Republic 
Fernando Arturo de Meriño, a priest who would later become an archbishop, served as President of the Dominican Republic from 1880 to 1882.

France 
Barthélemy Boganda, a priest from Ubangi-Shari (today the Central African Republic), was elected to the French National Assembly in 1946, serving until 1958. He left the priesthood in 1950 and married, and from 1958 to 1959 served as the first Prime Minister of the Central African Republic.

Germany 
Beda Weber was a German Benedictine priest who served as a member of the Frankfurt Parliament in 1849.

Ludwig Kaas was a priest of the Weimar Republic. In 1919 he was elected to the Weimar National Assembly and in 1920 was elected to the Reichstag, where he served until 1933.

Libya 
For a brief period in 2011 during the Libyan Civil War, the Nicaraguan priest Miguel d'Escoto Brockmann served as the Libyan ambassador to the United Nations.

Nicaragua 
In the 1970s and 80s, the President of Nicaragua, Daniel Ortega, appointed three priests to his cabinet: Miguel d'Escoto Brockmann as Minister of Foreign Affairs, Fernando Cardenal as Minister of Education, and his brother, Ernesto Cardenal, as Minister of Culture.

Paraguay 

In 2005, Fernando Lugo, the Bishop of San Pedro, requested laicization to run for office but it was denied. In 2008, he was elected President of Paraguay, in spite of Article 235 of the Constitution prohibiting any minister of any religion from serving as president. After his election he was laicized. In 2012, he was impeached for unrelated reasons.

Poland 
Hugo Kołłątaj was a Polish noble and Catholic priest who in 1786 received the office of the Referendary of Lithuania. He co-authored the Constitution of May 3, 1791 and held a variety of posts before falling out of political favor in 1802 as a result of his radical views.

Stanisław Staszic was a philosopher and political activist who served in the government of Congress Poland.

Slovakia and Czechoslovakia 
Andrej Hlinka served in the Parliament of Czechoslovakia from 1920 to 1938 and was leader of the Slovak People's Party from 1913 until his death.

From 1939 to 1945, the priest Jozef Tiso was President of the First Slovak Republic, a satellite state of Nazi Germany. Following World War II, he was convicted and hanged for treason that subsumed also war crimes, and crimes against humanity.

Solomon Islands 
Augustine Geve was a Catholic priest who served as a member of the National Parliament from 2001 to 2002 and was Minister of Youth, Women and Sports from 2001 to 2002. He was assassinated on 20 August 2002.

United States 
Possibly the earliest known instance of a Catholic priest serving in public office in the United States was Gabriel Richard. Born in France, he founded the University of Michigan and served as a delegate from Michigan Territory from 1823 to 1825.

Two priests, Robert Drinan and Robert John Cornell, have served in the United States Congress.  In 1980, when Pope John Paul II decreed that priests not serve in elected office, Representative Drinan withdrew from his re-election campaign, and Cornell withdrew from his bid to re-gain the seat he had lost in the 1978 Congressional election. In 1983, the prohibition on serving in governmental office was codified as section 3 of canon 285 of the 1983 Code of Canon Law.

List of priests who have held public office 

Listed below are the names of the priests, and the countries they served in parentheses.
 Fernando Arturo de Meriño (Dominican Republic)
 Barthélemy Boganda (France, Central African Republic)
 Ernesto Cardenal (Nicaragua)
 Fernando Cardenal (Nicaragua)
 Robert John Cornell (US)
 Robert Drinan (US)
 Miguel d'Escoto Brockmann (Nicaragua, Libya)
 Augustine Geve (Solomon Islands)
 Raymond Gravel (Canada)
 Andrej Hlinka (Czechoslovakia)
 Andrew Hogan (Canada)
 Theodor Innitzer (Austria)
 Ludwig Kaas (Germany)
 Hugo Kołłątaj (Poland)
 Fernando Lugo (Paraguay)
 Robert Ogle (Canada)
 Gabriel Richard (US)
 Ignaz Seipel (Austria)
 Stanisław Staszic (Poland)
 Jozef Tiso (Slovakia)
 Beda Weber (Germany)
 Fulbert Youlou (France, Republic of the Congo)
Jean-Bertrand Aristide (Haiti)
Jean-Baptiste Nguyễn Văn Riễn (Vietnam)
 Moses Oshio Adasu (Nigeria)

See also 
 Separation of church and state

References 

Catholic ecclesiastical titles
Catholic canon law of persons